Zhodzina or Zhodino (officially transliterated as Žodzina; , ; ,) is a city in Minsk Region, Belarus, located  north-east of Minsk.

History
The settlement is first mentioned in 1688, belonging to the Radziwiłł family.
It has had city status since 1963.

On 13 August 2020, Zhodzina was the site of the first large-scale worker strike in Belarus, at the BelAZ automobile plant, in protest of the contested results of the 2020 Belarusian presidential elections.

Geography
Zhodzina is divided by the Plisa river, and it has a small lake in its southern suburb.

Education
There are nine schools, two high schools, one professional lyceum and Zhodzina Polytechnical College in the city. Currently, there are no higher educational institutions in the city.

Economy
The BelAZ (The Belarusian Automobile Plant) is the largest employer in the city; it employs about 11,000 workers, one-sixth of the local population. Every third mining truck in the world is produced by BelAZ. The largest truck weighs 360 tonnes and can carry 450 tonnes of load. Another important factory is the clothing manufacturer SVITANAK, which produces children's and adults' clothes. Its products are exported to European countries.

Transport
Zhodzina is served by the M1 highway, part of the European route E30, an international highway that links Berlin and Warsaw to Moscow. It has two railway stations (Zhodzina and the stop of Zhodzina Yuzhny) on the international line Minsk-Moscow; and its main station is served by some international trains as the Sibirjak Berlin-Novosibirsk.

Sport

The local football club is the Torpedo-BelAZ Zhodino, playing in the Belarusian Premier League. Its home ground is the Torpedo Stadium.

Personalities
 
 

 Roman Golovchenko (b. 1973), prime minister
 Mikalay Kashewski (b. 1980), footballer
 Nastassia Novikava (b. 1981), weightlifter
 Yury Shumanski (b. 1980), retired Belarusian professional footballer

International relations

Zhodzina is twinned with:

 Dalanzadgad, Mongolia
 Hîncești, Moldova
 Horishni Plavni, Ukraine
 Kajaran, Armenia
 Mytishchi, Russia
 Neryungrinsky District, Russia
 Olmaliq, Uzbekistan
 Oryol, Russia
 Panagyurishte, Bulgaria
 Plastovsky District, Russia
 Považská Bystrica, Slovakia
 Rustavi, Georgia
 Ukmergė, Lithuania
 Verkhnyaya Pyshma, Russia
 Zheleznogorsk, Russia

See also
Prison Number 8

Notes and references

External links

 Zhodzina official website

 
Cities in Belarus
Populated places in Minsk Region
Cities and towns built in the Soviet Union
Populated places established in 1963
1963 establishments in Belarus